Campbell Island may refer to:

 Campbell Island, Torres Strait, Queensland, Australia
 Campbell Island (British Columbia), Canada
 Campbell Island, New Zealand
 Campbell Island (Maine), USA
 Campbell Island (North Carolina), USA